Impeachment: American Crime Story is the third season of the FX true-crime anthology television series American Crime Story. It consists of 10 episodes and premiered on September 7, 2021. The season portrays the Clinton–Lewinsky scandal, subsequent impeachment of Clinton and is based on the book A Vast Conspiracy: The Real Story of the Sex Scandal That Nearly Brought Down a President by Jeffrey Toobin.

The cast includes Sarah Paulson, Annaleigh Ashford, and Judith Light (all returning from previous seasons), along with Beanie Feldstein, Clive Owen, Margo Martindale, Billy Eichner, Cobie Smulders, Edie Falco, Taran Killam, Colin Hanks, and Elizabeth Reaser. The series received generally favorable reviews from critics.

Cast

Main
 Sarah Paulson as Linda Tripp
 Beanie Feldstein as Monica Lewinsky
 Annaleigh Ashford as Paula Jones
 Margo Martindale as Lucianne Goldberg
 Edie Falco as Hillary Clinton
 Clive Owen as President Bill Clinton

Recurring

Guest

Episodes

Production

Development 
In January 2017, it was announced that a fourth season of American Crime Story was in development, set to air after Katrina, which was eventually dropped. It was to cover the Clinton–Lewinsky scandal and the ensuing events during Clinton's presidency, based on Jeffrey Toobin's book A Vast Conspiracy: The Real Story of the Sex Scandal That Nearly Brought Down a President. However, in April 2018, creator Ryan Murphy revealed that the season was scrapped and no longer in development.

On August 6, 2019, it was announced that the Clinton–Lewinsky scandal season was back in development as the third season of the series, which would be written by Sarah Burgess and titled Impeachment. The season began production in October 2020.

Casting 
In February 2017, Murphy revealed that Sarah Paulson was to star in the season, but not as Hillary Clinton. It was later revealed that Paulson, Beanie Feldstein, and Annaleigh Ashford would star as Linda Tripp, Monica Lewinsky, and Paula Jones, respectively, with Lewinsky herself signing on as a co-producer. Later that month, it was announced that the character of Hillary Clinton would not be significant in the series. 

On November 15, 2019, it was reported that Clive Owen would play Bill Clinton and Anthony Green, Al Gore. Later that month, it was announced that Margo Martindale would portray Lucianne Goldberg. In January 2020, it was announced that Billy Eichner had signed on to play Matt Drudge. 

In March 2021, it was announced that Edie Falco and Betty Gilpin would portray Hillary Clinton and Ann Coulter, respectively; Gilpin later exited the series due to scheduling conflicts, and was replaced by Cobie Smulders. It was also announced that Judith Light would play Susan Carpenter-McMillan. 

In August 2021, it was announced that Mira Sorvino, Blair Underwood, Joseph Mazzello, Dan Bakkedahl, Kevin Pollak, and Patrick Fischler had joined the cast in recurring roles.

Filming 
Principal photography was set to begin on March 21, 2020 but was halted due to the COVID-19 pandemic. On November 13, 2020, Sarah Paulson posted an image of herself as Linda Tripp with the caption, "Linda. American Crime Story: Impeachment has begun principal photography." Filming concluded in August 2021.

Release 
The official teaser for the series was released on August 4, 2021. The series was set to have been released on September 27, 2020, but this was delayed due to the pandemic. 
The first episode was released on September 7, 2021.

Due to a 2016 agreement between 20th Century Fox Television (now 20th Television) and Netflix, which predates the acquisition of FX and 20th Television by Disney, Netflix holds exclusive global SVOD streaming rights to the American Crime Story franchise (except in Canada), with Impeachment expected to arrive on that service in 2022. As such, unlike most other FX shows, which are available on the FX on Hulu hub in the U.S., Impeachment was not made available on a next-day basis to subscribers to Hulu's base service, but was available on-demand (and on the FXNow TV Everywhere platform) to subscribers to the FX channel, including those subscribed via Hulu + Live TV. However, on March 3, 2022, Hulu has announced that starting March 7 all 3 seasons of American Crime Story including Impeachment, as well as Ryan Murphy's two other FX shows American Horror Story (including its spinoff American Horror Stories) and Pose will be available for streaming on Hulu, with future seasons becoming available for next day streaming on the FX on Hulu platform.

The season first broadcast in the United Kingdom in weekly episodes on BBC Two, starting on October 19, 2021.

Reception

Critical response 
The review aggregator Rotten Tomatoes gave the season an approval rating of 69% based on 71 reviews, with an average rating of 6.8/10. The site's critical consensus reads, "Impeachment can't seem to decide whether it's unearthing the humanity of a presidential scandal or indulging the mythology of its media circus, but Beanie Feldstein and Sarah Paulson's performances ring true in the midst of all the noise." On Metacritic, the season has a score of 61 out of 100, based on 33 critics, indicating "generally favorable reviews."

James Jackson of The Times gave the season four out of five stars, deeming it "a gleefully watchable bonkbuster" and praising the performances of the cast. 

Lucy Mangan of The Guardian also gave it four out of five stars, saying that it was "a weaker instalment than The People v OJ Simpson", but added: "it holds up well in terms of propulsive, addictive drama. It's a rich, soapy lather shot through with comedy and an irresistible wholeheartedness." Susannah Butter of the Evening Standard also gave it four out of five stars, writing: "As a piece of storytelling it is compelling -- and all credit to Lewinsky for having the courage to come forward and tell her version of events."

Benjamin Lee, also writing for The Guardian, gave it three out of five stars. He wrote: "There's at times a little bit too much for the show to take on, especially one that tends to repeat itself, and it works best when the focus remains tight on Tripp, whose bizarre travails grip even when the show around her slips." 

Fiona Sturges of the Financial Times also gave it three out of five stars, writing: "The narrative is expertly paced and has a soapy quality which, though distracting at first, becomes increasingly moreish as the series progresses." 

Kelly Lawler of USA Today gave it two and a half out of four stars, writing: "there are many moments of brilliance, but they are simply not strung together with much finesse. Impeachment ends up as a glossy, well-acted series without much to say."

James Poniewozik of The New York Times was more critical, writing: "Despite several striking performances, its perspective and ideas break out only occasionally from underneath the pancaked strata of details." Melanie McFarland of Salon.com wrote: "At times you may question whether the other actors realize they're in the same show as Feldstein or whether that show is a drama or a dark comedy." 

Alan Sepinwall of Rolling Stone gave it two out of five stars, writing: "With the exception of Beanie Feldstein's wonderful, deeply sympathetic portrayal of Lewinsky, Impeachment is unfortunately everything one might have feared about The People v. O.J. before it debuted."

Accolades

Response from involved parties 
Allison Tripp, the daughter of Linda Tripp, reacted positively to the show's empathetic depiction of her mother and Sarah Paulson's performance. According to Paulson, she never had a chance to consult Tripp on the project prior to her death in 2020, a year before the show's release.

Bill and Hillary Clinton, according to executive producer Dana Walden, have not officially commented on the show, though the producers made sure to repeatedly vet the writing so that it could appeal to them without consequence.

References

External links 
 
 

2021 American television seasons
American Crime Story seasons
Cultural depictions of Bill Clinton
Cultural depictions of Hillary Clinton
Cultural depictions of Monica Lewinsky
Works about the impeachment of Bill Clinton
Primetime Emmy Award-winning television series
Television series set in the 1990s
Television shows based on non-fiction books
Television shows set in Washington, D.C.
Television series about Bill Clinton